Lee Seung-yeoul (Hanja: 李昇烈; born 6 March 1989) is a former South Korean football winger. He started playing football in Shin-gal High School. He is often known as one of the brightest prospects displaying attacking style in the national team. He was considered to be the newer generation of Korean footballers that will make up the national team in the future until his form started to fall.

Club career

FC Seoul

2008

Lee joined FC Seoul in 2008 with being drafted from the team. He played as a striker and attacking midfielder for FC Seoul. He appeared in the K League and the Hauzen Cup for 31 games and scored 5 goals in his first year as a professional player.

After a successful first season, he was nominated and won 2008 K-League Rookie of the Year.

2009
Lee scored in the opening match of the 2009 K-League season against Chunnam Dragons. The game ended 6–1 for FC Seoul. He made 22 appearances and 5 goals in 2009 K-League.

2010
In the 2010 league campaign, Lee had best record in his FC Seoul era. He scored 7 goals in 25 appearances and also steadily recalled to the national team.

Gamba Osaka
On 1 February 2012, Lee left Seoul for Japanese J1 League outfit Gamba Osaka.

Club statistics

International career
His international career began when he played for the U-18 South Korea football team.

He has been named in the preliminary squad for the Beijing Olympic Games.

He was a member of 2009 FIFA U-20 World Cup. After U20 World Cup, he was selected by Hong Myung-bo that head coach of South Korea U-23.

On 9 January 2010, Lee made his first international cap for South Korea at the friendly match against Zambia.

He scored his first goal against Hong Kong on 7 February 2010.

Although he was part of the 2010 FIFA World Cup squad, he only got 5 minutes to play in the opening match against Greece where they won 2:0. Lee was benched for the next 3 matches. Huh decided to use the more experienced Lee Dong-gook and Yeom Ki-hun instead of young Lee Seung-yeoul. Korean public has expressed that the only reason he didn't get enough playing time at the World Cup, was because Lee was inexperienced, despite showing good form and having scored 3 international goals in the run up to the World Cup. Seung Ryul has expressed his desire to train hard for the upcoming 2010 Asian Games and hopes to break into Europe. He has also expressed that the World Cup was a valuable experience and learned a lot from training with Park Ji-sung.

International goals

Honours
FC Seoul
 K League 1 (1): 2010
 League Cup (1): 2010

Ulsan Hyundai
 AFC Champions League (1): 2012

Jeonbuk Hyundai Motors
 K League 1 (1) : 2014

Individual
K-League Rookie of the Year (1): 2008

References

External links

 
 

1989 births
Living people
Association football forwards
South Korean footballers
South Korean expatriate footballers
South Korea international footballers
FC Seoul players
Ulsan Hyundai FC players
Gamba Osaka players
Seongnam FC players
Jeonbuk Hyundai Motors players
J1 League players
K League 1 players
Expatriate footballers in Japan
South Korean expatriate sportspeople in Japan
2010 FIFA World Cup players
Sportspeople from Gyeonggi Province
South Korean Buddhists